George Henry Waft Dip App SS B.Sc.(Hons) RMN MLC is a former Member of the Legislative Council of the Isle of Man.

Mr Waft was educated at the Isle of Man College of Further Education, the Naval Training School and the Nurse Training School. He became a catering officer for various naval companies and then worked for the DHSS for 30 years as well as being an Onchan Commissioner for 20 years. In 1991 was elected to the House of Keys representing Onchan. He remained an MHK for Onchan until his elevation to the Legislative Council in 1994. His interests are the countryside, computers, amateur radio, swimming and fishing.

Governmental positions
Chairman of the Civil Service Commission, 1996–2004
Chairman of the Whitely Council, 1996–2004
Formerly (until 2014) Chairman Ballamona Association for Mental Health, a Charitable company Limited by Guarantee No.194 A
 George Waft Retired from Legco March 2010

Publications
George Waft has written a book, From Tynwald Street to Tynwald Hill. First published in 2006.

References

Members of the House of Keys 1991–1996
Members of the Legislative Council of the Isle of Man
Living people
Year of birth missing (living people)